Ren Klyce is a Japanese-American sound designer and sound mixer. He has been nominated for nine Academy Awards; six for Best Sound and three for Best Sound Editing. He is best known for his frequent collaborations with director David Fincher, having been the primary sound designer on every one of his films since Seven, including The Girl with the Dragon Tattoo. He is also known for his frequent collaborations with Spike Jonze.

Klyce was born in Kyoto, Japan, and moved to California at a young age, where he grew up in Mill Valley. He graduated from the University of California, Santa Cruz.

Filmography

 Se7en (1995) - Sound Designer/Effect Supervisor
 The Game (1997) - Sound Designer/Supervising Sound Editor
 Fight Club (1999) - Best Sound Editing
 Being John Malkovich (1999) - Sound Designer
 Panic Room (2002) - Sound Designer
 Zodiac (2006) - Sound Designer/Re-Recording Mixer/Supervising Sound Editor
 The Curious Case of Benjamin Button (2008) - Supervising Sound Editor/Re-Recording Mixer - Best Sound Mixing
 Where the Wild Things Are (2009) - Sound Designer/Re-Recording Mixer
 The Social Network (2010) - Sound Designer/Supervising Sound Editor/Re-Recording Mixer - Best Sound Mixing
 The Girl with the Dragon Tattoo (2011) - Sound Designer/Supervising Sound Editor/Re-Recording Mixer - Best Sound Mixing and Best Sound Editing
 Oblivion (2013) - Supervising Sound Designer
 House of Cards (2013-) - Sound Designer
 Her (2013) - Sound Supervisor
 The Boxtrolls (2014) - Supervising Sound Designer/Re-Recording Mixer
 Gone Girl (2014) - Sound Designer/Re-Recording Mixer/Sound Supervisor
 Inside Out (2015) - Sound Designer
 Alice Through the Looking Glass (2016) - Supervising Sound Editor
 Star Wars: The Last Jedi (2017) - Sound Designer/Re-Recording Mixer/Supervising Sound Editor
 Mindhunter (2017-2018) - Sound Designer
Incredibles 2 (2018) - Sound Designer
Toy Story 4 (2019) - Sound Designer

Session discography

 Divine Emotion (1988) - Narada Michael Walden - Synthesizer [Fairlight CMI]
 Verge of Love (1988) - Yoko Oginome - Synthesizer [Fairlight CMI], Percussion Programming
 Indestructible (1988) - Four Tops - Synthesizer [Fairlight CMI]
 Through the Storm (1989) - Aretha Franklin - Synthesizer [Fairlight CMI], Keyboards
 Stay with Me (1989) - Regina Belle - Synthesizer [Fairlight CMI]
 A Night with Mr. C (1989) - Clarence Clemons - Synthesizer [Fairlight CMI]
 Be Yourself (1989) - Patti LaBelle - Synthesizer [Fairlight CMI]
 License to Kill (1989) - Gladys Knight - Synthesizer [Fairlight CMI], Sequence Programming
 So Happy (1989) - Eddie Murphy - Synthesizers [Fairlight CMI, Emulator II]
 Good to Be Back (1989) - Natalie Cole - Synthesizers [Fairlight CMI, Emulator II]
 I'm Your Baby Tonight (1990) - Whitney Houston - Synthesizer [Fairlight CMI], Programming
 Kiss Me with the Wind (1990) - Brenda Russell - Synthesizer [Fairlight CMI]
 Mariah Carey (1990) - Mariah Carey - LinnDrum, Synthesizer [Fairlight CMI], Rhythm Programming
 Can You Stop the Rain (1991) - Peabo Bryson - Drums, Percussions, Synclavier, Synthesizer Programming [Akai]
 Emotions (1991) - Mariah Carey - Programming, Synclavier, Synthesizer [Akai]
 H.I.T.S. (1991) - New Kids on the Block - Synthesizer [Akai], Synclavier
 Trey Lorenz (1992) - Trey Lorenz - Programming, Synclavier, Synthesizer [Akai], Producer, Drum Programming, Keyboards
 Breathless (1992) - Kenny G - Programming, Synthesizer [Akai]
 Celine Dion (1992) - Celine Dion - Synclavier, Synthesizer Programming [Akai]
 Music Box (1993) - Mariah Carey - Keyboard Programming, Synclavier, Synthesizer Programming [Akai], Synthesizer [Roland]
 Penny Ford (1993) - Penny Ford - Drums, Bass Programming, Drum Programming, Synthesizers [Akai, Fairlight CMI]
 Passion (1993) - Regina Belle - Programming, Synthesizer [Akai]
 The Colour of My Love (1993) - Celine Dion - Synthesizer Programming [Akai]
 Songs (1994) - Luther Vandross - Additional Programming, Synthesizer [Akai]
 Head over Heels (1995) - Paula Abdul - Drum Programming [Additional]

References

External links

Year of birth missing (living people)
Living people
American audio engineers
American sound editors
People from Kyoto
People from Mill Valley, California
American people of Japanese descent
Japanese emigrants to the United States